Tyrone Anthony Holmes (born September 10, 1993) is a former American football outside linebacker. He was drafted by the Jacksonville Jaguars in the sixth round of the 2016 NFL Draft. He played college football at Montana.

Professional career

Jacksonville Jaguars
Holmes was drafted by the Jacksonville Jaguars in the sixth round with the 181st overall pick in the 2016 NFL Draft. On September 3, 2016, he was released by the Jaguars.

Cleveland Browns
Holmes was claimed off waivers by the Cleveland Browns on September 4, 2016.

On September 3, 2017, Holmes was waived by the Browns, but was re-signed on September 7. He was waived again on September 16, 2017 and re-signed to the practice squad. He was promoted to the active roster on November 21, 2017. He was waived on December 13, 2017.

Kansas City Chiefs
On December 14, 2017, Holmes was signed to the Kansas City Chiefs' practice squad. He signed a reserve/future contract with the Chiefs on January 10, 2018. He was waived on September 1, 2018.

Los Angeles Chargers
On December 26, 2018, Holmes was signed to the Los Angeles Chargers practice squad.

San Antonio Commanders (AAF)
In December 2018, Holmes signed with the San Antonio Commanders of the AAF before departing the team to join the Chargers practice squad. He returned to the Commanders on January 22, 2019.

Miami Dolphins
After the AAF suspended football operations, Holmes signed with the Miami Dolphins on April 9, 2019. He was released on August 31, 2019.

References

1993 births
Living people
People from Eagle Point, Oregon
Players of American football from Oregon
American football linebackers
Montana Grizzlies football players
Cleveland Browns players
Jacksonville Jaguars players
Kansas City Chiefs players
San Antonio Commanders players
Los Angeles Chargers players
Miami Dolphins players